Annett may refer to:

Surname
 Annett (Hampshire cricketer), played first class cricket 1788–1792
 Chloë Annett (born 1971), English actress
 Max Annett (1931–2015), Australian rower
 Michael Annett (born 1986), American motor racing driver
 Niall Annett (born 1991), Irish rugby player
 Paul Annett (1937–2017), English director

Given name
 Annett Böhm (born 1980), German judoka
 Annett Davis (born 1973), American beach volleyball player
 Annett Fleischer (born 1979), German actress
 Annett Gamm (born 1977), German diver
 Annett Hesselbarth (born 1966), retired German sprinter
 Annett Horna (born 1987), German athlete
 Annett Louisan (born 1977), German singer
 Annett Neumann (born 1970), German cyclist
 Annett Renneberg (born 1978), German actress and singer
 Annett Rex (born 1969), German swimmer
 Annett Wagner-Michel (born 1955), German chess player
 Annett Wolf (born 1936), Danish director

Other uses
 Annett's key, a component of railway signalling